Johnny Heaney is a Gaelic footballer who plays for Killannin and the Galway county team. His usual position is as a half-forward.

His father comes from Mayo. He scored a goal against Mayo at MacHale Park, towards the end of the 2018 Connacht Senior Football Championship quarter-final. It was his fourth year of involvement with the Galway team, having made his championship debut in 2016.

He scored a goal against Armagh in the quarter-final of the 2022 All-Ireland Senior Football Championship.

Career statistics
As of match played 24 July 2022

References

Year of birth missing (living people)
Living people
Galway inter-county Gaelic footballers
Killannin Gaelic footballers